The 2003 Big 12 Conference women's soccer tournament was the postseason women's soccer tournament for the Big 12 Conference held from November 6 to 9, 2003. The 7-match tournament was held at the Blossom Athletic Center in San Antonio, TX with a combined attendance of 4,293. The 8-team single-elimination tournament consisted of three rounds based on seeding from regular season conference play. The Oklahoma State Cowgirls defeated the Missouri Tigers in the championship match to win their 1st conference tournament.

Regular season standings
Source:

Bracket

Awards

Most valuable player
Source:
Offensive MVP – Cassie Lewis – Oklahoma State
Defensive MVP – Kathrin Lehmann – Oklahoma State

All-Tournament team

References 

 
Big 12 Conference Women's Soccer Tournament